The Mauritius Fed Cup team represents Mauritius in Fed Cup tennis competition and are governed by the Mauritius Tennis Federation. They have not competed since 2008.

History
Mauritius competed in its first Fed Cup in 2000.  Their best result was fourth place in their Group II pool in 2000.

See also
Fed Cup
Mauritius Davis Cup team

External links

Billie Jean King Cup teams
Fed Cup
Fed Cup